St Joseph's Catholic College was a Roman Catholic Girls' school situated in Manningham, close to Bradford city centre in West Yorkshire, England. The school merged with St. Bede's Grammar School in September 2014 to form St Bede's and St Joseph's Catholic College.

School history
The college was founded by the Order of the Sisters of the Cross and Passion in 1908. It was a direct grant grammar school until 1977 when it became a Voluntary Aided 13-19 Girls' School under the trusteeship of the 
Diocese of Leeds, which owns the buildings and grounds, and appoints the majority of the Governors. In 1995 due to Bradford Catholic re-organisation the College became an 11–19 Catholic Girls' School.

The college's first headmistress from 1908–1916 was Mother Gonzaga. From 1916–1956 the headmistress was Mother Sister Mary Immaculate (born ca. 1890 – died 1977), Yorkshire Women of the Century, educationalist, overseeing St Joseph’s to become one of the major Catholic girls' grammar schools in the country. The college's motto was "Per Crucem ad Lucem" - Through the Cross to the Light.

From 2008 the school had a federated governing body with St. Bede's Grammar School and Yorkshire Martyrs Catholic College. When Yorkshire Martyrs closed in 2010 the girls transferred to St Joseph's. 

The school merged with St. Bede's Grammar School in September 2014 to form St Bede's and St Joseph's Catholic College. The former St. Joseph's is now used as the lower school site of the new school.

Sixth Form
St Joseph's shared an associated sixth form with St. Bede's Grammar School for many years.  In 2008 the sixth forms of St Bede's and St Joseph's joined with the sixth form of Yorkshire Martyrs Catholic College to form the Bradford Catholic Sixth Form.  When Yorkshire Martyrs closed in 2010 the sixth form transferred to St Bede's and St Joseph's and in 2011 the Sixth Form was renamed St Benedict's Sixth Form.

Notable former Joseph's girls
Graduates include Olympic medalists, diplomats, members of parliament, television journalists, actresses, artists, writers, professors, religious sisters and bankers.

Heather Peace, actress and singer
 Rachel Leskovac, actress
 Sophie McShera, actress who played Daisy Mason the kitchen maid in Downton Abbey
 Elizabeth Stratford, composer
 Steph Swainston, author
 Alannah Halay, composer and author.

Direct-grant grammar school
 Kathryn Apanowicz, actress and TV presenter, the long-term partner of the late Richard Whiteley
 Kathleen Baxter, English women's rights activist
 Prof Kathleen Bell CBE 
 Jane Ellison, Conservative MP for Battersea from 2010–17
 Bronwyn Hill, British civil servant, currently serving as the Permanent Secretary since 2011 of the Department for Environment, Food and Rural Affairs
 Anita Lonsbrough, winner of the women's 200m breaststroke at the 1960 Rome Olympics
 Linda McAvan, Labour MEP 1999-2019 for Yorkshire and the Humber, and from 1994–99 for Yorkshire South
 Ruth Mitchell, actress
 Diana Warwick, Baroness Warwick of Undercliffe, General Secretary from 1983–93 of the Association of University Teachers (AUT), Chief Executive from 1995–2009 of Universities UK, and Chair from 2010–14 of the Human Tissue Authority (HTA)

References

External links
 St Joseph's Catholic College (Archive copy)
 St Bede's and St Joseph's Catholic College

Defunct grammar schools in England
Schools in Bradford
Educational institutions established in 1908
1908 establishments in England
Defunct Catholic schools in the Diocese of Leeds
Defunct schools in the City of Bradford
Educational institutions disestablished in 2014
2014 disestablishments in England